Big Kimshew Creek is a stream in northern California in the United States, some  long. It flows generally SSW from its headwaters in the Lassen National Forest of the Sierra Nevada into the West Branch Feather River, a tributary of the Feather River, a major Northern California river system.

The creek is known for its whitewater rapids and waterfalls.

Geography
The creek rises in a meadow 1 mile (1.6 km) northwest of Table Mountain in the southern extreme of the national forest. It flows south into a gorge, receiving Keyser Creek from the right, and Little Kimshew Creek from the left shortly after. It is joined by Little Rock Creek just above the confluence with the West Branch Feather.

External links
ACME Mapper - Big Kimshew Creek
American Whitewater: Big Kimshew Creek

Rivers of the Sierra Nevada (United States)
Rivers of Butte County, California
Tributaries of the Feather River
Rivers of Northern California
Rivers of the Sierra Nevada in California